The 207th Aviation Regiment is a regiment of the United States Army National Guard organized under the United States Army Regimental System.

Structure

 1st Battalion (General Support), 207th Aviation Regiment (AK ARNG)(UH-60, C-12, CH-47, UH-72) 
 Company B

References

207
Regiments of the United States Army National Guard